Eric Okechukwu Ejiofor (born 17 December 1979 in Asaba, Delta State) is a Nigerian footballer.

Career
Ejiofor played for Enosis Neon Paralinmi FC in the Cypriot First Division until 2009, after which he retired from professional football.

Honours
Israeli Premier League (1):
2003–04

External links
 
 

1979 births
Living people
Nigerian footballers
Nigerian expatriate footballers
Association football defenders
Enosis Neon Paralimni FC players
Alki Larnaca FC players
Maccabi Haifa F.C. players
F.C. Ashdod players
Expatriate footballers in Israel
2002 FIFA World Cup players
2002 African Cup of Nations players
Nigeria international footballers
Expatriate footballers in Cyprus
Shooting Stars S.C. players
Katsina United F.C. players
Enyimba F.C. players
Israeli Premier League players
Cypriot First Division players